Sulo Johannes Teittinen (3 July 1882, Juva – 11 August 1964) was a Finnish engineer, civil servant, farmer and politician. He was a Member of the Parliament of Finland from 1939 to 1948, representing the National Progressive Party.

References

1882 births
1964 deaths
People from Juva
People from Mikkeli Province (Grand Duchy of Finland)
National Progressive Party (Finland) politicians
Members of the Parliament of Finland (1939–45)
Members of the Parliament of Finland (1945–48)
Finnish people of World War II